The Women's Eights Head of the River Race (WEHoRR) is a processional rowing race held annually on the Tideway of the River Thames in London on the  Championship Course from Mortlake to Putney.

A mirror of the Eights Head of the River for male crews, it is held a fortnight earlier when the tides are similar. It is raced on the outgoing tide and starting around one hour after high tide in order to maximise advantage from the tidal flow.

Around 300 crews of women (with the occasional male coxswain) compete for over a dozen trophies and pennants. There are categories for beginners, elite and veteran rowers.

History 

The race was first held in 1927 following the first running of the men's version in 1926. At first it was simply a match between Ace and Weybridge LARC. This race was run as a side-by-side race, with Weybridge winning in a boat borrowed from Thames Rowing Club. The second year featured the same two crews, and the same result. In 1929, for the third race, there was the addition of Alpha, having formed in a split from Ace in 1927. Alpha won this running of the race.

The first running of the race in processional format was in 1930, as the entries had risen to five, making it impossible to run fairly in the side-by-side format on the tidal river. Furnivall Sculling Club (then an all women's club) won this first processional version of the race. It then continued in similar format annually until the outbreak of war in 1939.

The event restarted in 1950, with a shortened course of 2 miles, as it was felt that the effects of the war years and food rationing made the full course too hard. Entries grew from the original five to twelve by the mid 50s, and then declined to only six by the mid 60s. The lack of sectional boats meant that it was extremely difficult to transport boats from further afield, so the event was largely confined to the London clubs.

In the period from the 1970s onwards, entries rose ten-fold from 27 in 1977 to 300 in 2009. International crews have been visiting London to compete and entries have come from France, Germany, Italy, Spain, Sweden, Switzerland, the Netherlands and United States.

Records

Past winners

See also
Rowing on the River Thames
Head of the River Race
Head of the River Fours

References

External links
Women's Eights Head of the River Race web site

Mortlake, London
Rowing on the River Thames
Water sports in London
Head races
Recurring sporting events established in 1927
1927 establishments in England
Women's rowing in the United Kingdom
Annual sporting events in the United Kingdom
Annual events in London
Women's sports competitions in England
Women's sport in London